Philip Williams (born 5 April 1958, Birkenhead) is an English former footballer.

A product of Chester's youth policy, Williams made a solitary appearance in The Football League for the club when wearing the number nine shirt during a 0–0 draw at home to Preston North End on 11 September 1976.

He did not make any further first-team appearances for Chester and later played for Cray Wanderers.

Bibliography

References

1958 births
Living people
Sportspeople from Birkenhead
English Football League players
Association football forwards
English footballers
Chester City F.C. players
Cray Wanderers F.C. players